is a Japanese anime television series animated by Encourage Films. The series premiered it first season on April 5, 2017, with the second season started airing on October 5, 2017.

Plot
Five rice-inspired students learn at the Kokuritsu Inaho Academy, a school on the verge of shutting down, and they form a new group called "Love Rice". The five handsome boys work hard in an attempt to supplant bread as the popular grain at the school, but their efforts are challenged by the new students form the "Love Rice" unit. They have to perform at the "Harvest Show", showing how delicious rice grains are.

Voice cast

Main characters

Supporting characters

Other characters

Media

Manga
A manga adaptation titled Love Kome: Rice is Beautiful launched on Comic Smart's free manga website Ganma!. A second manga by the series' character designer, Levin Aoi, titled Comic Love Kome: The Rice Plant or the Seed began running in Ichijinsha's Monthly Comic Zero Sum.

Anime
The anime was announced at Tochigi TV's anime song event "Tochi Ani! Special Stage" on November 26, 2016, anthropomorphizing rice into schoolboys. The series was directed by Takashi Horiuchi, and produced by Yoshitada Fukuhara. Takashi Ifukube wrote the scripts and Yuta Yamazaki served as series director respectively. Manga artist Levin Aoi designed the characters, with Tomoyo Sawada adapting the designs for the anime. Plus Tsubasa composed the music, Kogane Fusa was the sound director, and Toru Nakano was the sound producer. The series was planned by Yaoyorozu, with Encourage Films animating the series. Crunchyroll had the license to stream the series worldwide outside of Asia. The series began airing on April 5, 2017 on Tokyo MX and ran for 12 episodes.

A second season was announced during a live stream event on June 30, 2017. It featured a returning staff. Encourage Films, which produced the first season, remained as the production studio, with all voice cast members reprising their roles from the anime. Crunchyroll still streamed the season worldwide outside of Asia.

Season 1 (2017)

Season 2 (2017)

Stage plays
The series received several stage plays in 2017 and 2018.

See also 

 Cooking manga

Notes

References

External links
  
 
 

2017 anime television series debuts
Anime with original screenplays
Comedy anime and manga
Cooking in anime and manga
Crunchyroll anime
Encourage Films
School life in anime and manga
Tokyo MX original programming